Osphranter is a genus of large marsupials in the family Macropodidae, commonly known as kangaroos and wallaroos (among other species). It contains the largest extant marsupial, the red kangaroo (O. rufus).

In 2019, a reassessment of macropod taxonomy determined that Osphranter and Notamacropus, formerly considered subgenera of Macropus, should be moved to the genus level. This change was accepted by the Australian Faunal Directory in 2020.

Species

References

External Links

Macropods
Marsupials of Australia
Marsupial genera